Benjamin Bowditch Thayer (October 20, 1862 – February 22, 1933) was a vice president of Anaconda Copper and served on the Naval Consulting Board. He was president of the New York Society of Harvard Engineers.

Biography
He was born on October 20, 1862, in San Francisco, California.  He attended the public schools in Quincy, Massachusetts then the Harvard School of Engineering and Applied Sciences at Harvard University. He married Marie Renouard.

He served on the Naval Consulting Board in 1915. He died on February 22, 1933, at New York Hospital following an operation. His widow died in 1950.

References

1862 births
1933 deaths
Harvard School of Engineering and Applied Sciences alumni
Naval Consulting Board
People from San Francisco